Bobby Reiss (born 30 September 1990) is a retired American professional soccer player.

Career
In May 2017 Reiss was named Head Coach, Women's Soccer, Midamerica Nazarene University, Olathe, KS.  He had served 3 years as assistant coach and the team achieved a  33-21-8, including two of the best years in program history in 2015 and 2016, reaching the NAIA National Tournament for the first time, as well as breaking into the top-25 schools in the nation. Reiss also graduated with his MBA in counseling from MNU this year.

College
Born in Palmdale, California, Reiss is a graduate of the California State University for which he played three seasons for the soccer team.

Atlanta Silverbacks
On 20 March 2013 it was announced that Reiss had signed a professional contract with the Atlanta Silverbacks of the North American Soccer League. Reiss then made his professional debut for the Silverbacks on 28 May 2013 in the US Open Cup against Real Salt Lake in which he started and played the full 90 as Atlanta lost the match 3–2.

On 30 June 2014 Reiss announced that he was stepping away from soccer to pursue an academic opportunity. He accepted a position as a graduate assistant for the women's soccer team at MidAmerica Nazarene University in Olathe, Kansas. While fulfilling his duties as a graduate assistant, he would also be pursuing a Master’s degree in counseling.

Career statistics

References

http://www.mnusports.com/news/2017/5/9/WS050917.aspx

External links 
 Atlanta Silverbacks Profile.
 

1990 births
Living people
American soccer players
Cal State Fullerton Titans men's soccer players
Lancaster Rattlers players
Atlanta Silverbacks players
Soccer players from California
USL League Two players
North American Soccer League players
Association football defenders
People from Palmdale, California